Fort Orange was the first permanent Dutch settlement in New Netherland; the present-day city of Albany, New York developed at this site. It was built in 1624 as a replacement for Fort Nassau, which had been built on nearby Castle Island and served as a trading post until 1617 or 1618, when it was abandoned due to frequent flooding. Both forts were named in honor of the Dutch House of Orange-Nassau. Due to a dispute between the Director-General of New Netherland and the patroonship of Rensselaerswyck regarding jurisdiction over the fort and the surrounding community, the fort and community became an independent municipality, paving the way for the future city of Albany. After the English reconquered the region they soon abandoned Fort Orange (renamed Fort Albany) in favor of a new fort: Fort Frederick, constructed in 1676.

History
 
In 1624, a ship with 30 Protestant Walloons (French-speaking people from what is today southern Belgium) landed in New Netherland; 18 of the men were sent to the location near present-day Albany.

The Walloons were later recalled south to settle New Amsterdam. A 1628 publication on the population of New Netherland stated that "there are no families at Fort Orange ... they keep five or six and twenty (25 or 26) persons, traders, there".  In 1626, the commander of Fort Orange and a company of men set out from the fort to assist the Mohican people in their war against the Mohawk, the powerful Iroquois tribe based in the Mohawk Valley to the west of the fort. The Dutch party was ambushed and three men were killed approximately a mile from the fort, roughly where Lincoln Park and Delaware Avenue are sited today.

Whereas later settlement would be through the purchase of land from the Native Americans, the Dutch built Fort Orange without any consent. They continued to hold it only through the goodwill of the Mahican, and the occasional presents that they gave to the local Mahicans.

This land patent was interpreted by van Rensselaer as including Fort Orange and the settlement that had begun outside its walls. He began purchasing and acquiring title to the lands from the Mahican.

In 1630, Gillis Hoosett purchased in van Rensselaer's name the lands to the south and north of the fort from the natives. Later in 1630 the first permanent Dutch settlers and farmers came to Fort Orange and settled on the outskirts of the fort; their village was first called the Fuyck and later Beverwyck. In 1634 the commander of Fort Orange ordered Harmen Meyndertsz van den Bogaert west into the Mohawk Valley and Indian country, for the purpose of understanding why the fur trade had declined. The trip lasted six weeks and took Bogaert and his men through a number of Mohawk villages and into Oneida villages, at least 100 miles from the fort. This journey was recorded in van den Bogaert's daily journal which is titled, A Journey into Mohawk and Oneida Country. In the 1640s a French Jesuit priest and missionary, Isaac Jogues, described Fort Orange as "a wretched little fort ... built of stakes, with four or five pieces of cannon of Breteuil".

In 1648, dispute arose between agents of the Dutch West India Company and agents of the patroon over control of Fort Orange and the surrounding settlement. The Director-General of New Netherland, representing the West India Company, was Pieter Stuyvesant, who saw the patroon's position, power, and land as a direct threat to the West India Company's ability to profit from the beaver pelt trade in Fort Orange. Several confrontations arose over the status of the fort and the rights of settlers around it. Stuyvesant at first ordered all buildings within cannon shot of the fort to be destroyed, then lowered that circumference to that of musket shot. In response, the patroon's agent, Commander van Schlechtenhorst, decided to expand settlement to "within pistol shot of Fort Orange".

After the yearly freshets had damaged much of the fort, the West India Company decided to reconstruct the fort using stone. In response, van Schlechtenhorst declared it illegal for anyone to quarry stone within Rensselaerswyck for the fort or for anyone to sell the material to the fort's commander, Carl van Brugge. All material for the fort had to be shipped in from outside the colony. Van Schlechtenhorst claimed that Fort Orange had been illegally built on the patroon's lands, while Stuyvesant noted that Fort Orange had been built 15 years prior to the establishment of Rensselaerswyck.

In 1651, Stuyvesant declared the jurisdiction of the fort to extend 600 paces around the fort, thereby severing it from Rensselaerswyck; he appointed Johannes Dyckman as commissary of Fort Orange. In 1652, Stuyvesant, to settle this dispute once and for all, set up a "Court of Justice for the Village of Beverwyck and its dependencies", the first municipal government for the future city of Albany.

At the time when Beverwyck consisted of roughly 100 structures huddled next to the fort, Stuyvesant set up Beverwyck at a safer distance from the cannons of the fort and laid out future Albany's oldest streets- State Street and Broadway.

By the end of the 1650s, the fort was in disrepair again, and both Fort Orange and Beverwyck were enclosed by a wooden stockade in 1660.

In 1663, smallpox raged in Fort Orange, killing one person a day, which was a large percentage given the small population in the fort. On September 8, 1664, the English, after sending numerous war ships to New Amsterdam, demanded the surrender of New Netherland and came to terms with the Dutch. On that date New Netherland became the Province of New York with Colonel Richard Nicolls appointed as the first English colonial governor; New Amsterdam was renamed New York. Johannes De Decker sailed on that day from New Amsterdam to Fort Orange to rally the troops and settlers to resist English rule. On September 10, Governor Nicholls sent troops to demand the peaceful surrender of the "Fort Aurania", aurania being the Latin name for "orange" that the English used when referring to Fort Orange.

It was not until September 24, 1664 that vice-director of New Netherland Johannes de Montagne surrendered the fort to the English, and Colonel George Cartwright took command. On the 25th, Captain John Manning was given control of the fort, which was renamed Fort Albany; Beverwyck was named Albany.

In 1673 the Dutch retook New York City, which they named New Orange, on July 29, then retook Albany on August 3. In September, Albany was renamed Willemstadt and Fort Albany became Fort Nassau. The Treaty of Westminster, signed on February 19, 1674, renamed New Orange and Willemstadt back to their English names; Fort Nassau became Fort Albany and Willemstadt became Albany.

In 1666, Jeremias van Rensselaer, then-patroon of Rensselaerswyck, had petitioned the new government of Governor Nicholls to recognize Fort Albany (Fort Orange) as part of Rensselaerswyck. Governor Nicholls informed him that he would be wise to drop the matter until he heard from the Duke of York. In 1678, Governor Andros issued to the patroon's heirs a grant reaffirming the patroon's rights over Rensselaerswyck, but leaving out Fort Albany and the immediate area around the fort.

The English abandoned Fort Orange and built a new fort on top of State Street Hill named Fort Frederick; it served both to defend the settlement from the Mohawk and other Iroquois to the west and to be on high ground to remind the Dutch inhabitants of English rule. The land around the old fort was sold to the Dutch Reformed Church for use as pastureland, but the fort structure continued to deteriorate. It was indicated on maps during the 18th century, labeled as "ruins of an Old Fort." Richard Smith, a traveler, observed by 1769 that there was "nothing to be seen of Fort Orange... but the Ditch which surrounded it". After the American Revolutionary War, the deteriorated site of the old fort was memorialized as a historic site and was the site of many historical observances.

Subsequent occupation
Simeon De Witt built a large house or mansion and a number of outbuildings on the site of the old fort during the 1790s; the address for the site of the old fort became 549 South Market Street (later Broadway). On his property traces of the old fort could still be seen as late as 1812. He lived at this location while he was the surveyor-general of New York. Following his death, his mansion and outbuildings were adapted for use as the Fort Orange Hotel. It burned down in 1848 but was rebuilt under the same name.

In 1886, as part of the bicentennial of Albany's incorporating document, the Dongan Charter, the city erected a bronze tablet at the site of the northeastern bastion of Fort Orange. In the 1930s the tablet was moved during construction of the Dunn Memorial Bridge, and for almost 100 years it did not mark the site of Fort Orange. The Albany Institute of History and Art has a cannonball labeled as "Dug up at Fort Orange site July 22nd 1886", the date the bicentennial marker was placed. No known archeological excavations were done other than placing the sign. The tablet was moved again in 1971 after excavations discovered remnants of the fort during construction of Interstate 787 and the interchange with the South Mall Expressway. The marker was returned to the site of Fort Orange, but not to the former location of the northeastern bastion.

As the Fort Orange Archeological Site, the area of the fort was declared a National Historic Landmark (and added to the National Register of Historic Places) on November 4, 1993.

Commanders of the fort
Adriaen Jorrissen Thienpont
Daniel van Krieckebeck ("Crieckenbeeck ... killed by Mohawks in 1626")
Bastiaen Jansz Krol ("appointed commissary of Fort Orange several months ... after ... was killed by Mohawks in 1626"; "Krol returned to the Netherlands in 1629") 
Hans Jorissen Houten
Carl van Brugge
Johannes Dyckman
Johannes de Decker
Johannes de la Montagne

as Fort Albany under the English
Captain John Manning
Captain John Baker

as Fort Nassau under the Dutch
Lieutenant Andries Draeyer

Excavations

Prior to the 1970 excavations, no 17th-century Dutch artifacts had been discovered in Albany. The excavations were undertaken by the New York State Historic Trust with the New York State Department of Transportation from October 20, 1970 until March 1971. The first test hole was made in what had been the cellar of the De Witt house, which had obliterated all remnants of the old fort. Digging at a site under Broadway in front of the house turned up many pieces from the Dutch colonial past. Among those were a Jew's harp, tobacco pipes, beads, Rhenish stoneware, and Delftware. The excavations also revealed the south moat and counterscarp, a pebbled path from the east entrance of the fort, a brewery owned by Jean Labatie built in 1647, and parts of several houses owned by Hendrick Andriessen van Doesburgh, Abraham Staats, and Hans Vos.

From the excavations, scholars noted that venison made up the majority of the meat eaten by the settlers of the fort, followed by pork. Sturgeon were found infrequently in later 17th-century deposits. Eating and drinking utensils consisted of lead-glazed red-bodied and white/buff bodied earthenware, tin earthenware, Rhenish stoneware, Chinese porcelain, glass roemers, Spechter glasses, and façon de Venise glassware. The tin-glazed earthenware, at least prior to 1650, were of the majolica variety and not delftware. Porcelain was rare, found only as a few shards. 
The remains of many clay pipes were found, often with the "EB" maker's mark of Eduard Bird  (c. 1610–65) of Amsterdam.
The site was in continual use and artifacts recovered include 1830s creamware or pearlware and 1860s copper bottom coffee pot remnants. The artifacts from the excavation are housed at the New York State Museum.

See also 

 History of Albany, New York
 List of National Historic Landmarks in New York
 National Register of Historic Places listings in Albany, New York
 Sebastian Croll

Notes

References

External links
 
 Fort Orange at the New York State Military Museum site
 Fort Orange, 1635 (painting) – a visualization by artist Leonard Tantillo, at the University at Albany, SUNY, University Art Museum, site
   (accompanying documentation to National Historic Landmark Nomination)

 National Register Information System database (search by location)

History of Albany, New York
Geography of Albany, New York
National Historic Landmarks in New York (state)
Archaeological sites in New York (state)
Orange
1624 establishments in the Dutch Empire
Orange
Archaeological sites on the National Register of Historic Places in New York (state)
Orange
National Register of Historic Places in Albany, New York